Broadway Serenade (also known as Serenade) is a 1939 musical drama film distributed by MGM, produced and directed by Robert Z. Leonard. The screenplay was written by Charles Lederer, based on a story by Lew Lipton, John Taintor Foote and Hanns Kräly. The music score is by Herbert Stothart and Edward Ward.

Cast
Jeanette MacDonald as Mary Hale 
Lew Ayres as James Geoffrey 'Jimmy' Seymour 
Ian Hunter as Larry Bryant 
Frank Morgan as Cornelius Collier, Jr. 
Wally Vernon as Joey, the Jinx 
Rita Johnson as Judith 'Judy' Tyrrell 
Virginia Grey as Pearl 
William Gargan as Bill Foster 
Katharine Alexander as Harriet Ingalls 
Al Shean as Herman 
Esther Dale as Mrs. Olsen, the Landlady 
Franklin Pangborn as Gene, Collier's Composer 
E. Alyn Warren as Everett 
Paul Hurst as Reynolds, a Drunk 
Frank Orth as Mr. Fellows 
Esther Howard as Mrs. Fellows 
Leon Belasco as Squeaker, the Violinist 
Kitty McHugh as Kitty, Mary's Maid 
Kenny Stevens as Singer
Ray Walker as Denny Madison
 Claude King as Mr. Gato

References

External links

1939 films
1930s romantic musical films
American musical drama films
American romantic drama films
American romantic musical films
American black-and-white films
Films directed by Robert Z. Leonard
Films scored by Herbert Stothart
Films set in New York City
Metro-Goldwyn-Mayer films
Films with screenplays by Charles Lederer
Films scored by Edward Ward (composer)
1930s English-language films
1930s American films